The 2017–18 Brose Bamberg season was the 63rd season of the German professional basketball club based in Bamberg. The team will play in the Basketball Bundesliga (BBL). Because of its championship in the previous BBL season, Bamberg would play in its third consecutive EuroLeague season.

This season was the fourth one under head coach Andrea Trinchieri. On 19 February, Trinchieri was released from his head coaching position by the club, after the team lost 12 of their last 15 games.

Club

Technical staff

Kit
Supplier: Macron / Sponsor: Brose

Roster

Competitions

Basketball Bundesliga

BBL-Pokal

Qualifying round

References

External links
Official website

2017–18 in German basketball
2017–18 EuroLeague by club